Himachali cap (Bushehri topi, Pahari topi, Kinnauri topi) is a distinctive headdress associated with Himachal Pradesh's culture. It is a part of the traditional dress of many Pahari inhabitants.

History 
The Himachali cap was historically related to Kinnaur and reached other parts of Himachal Pradesh via princely state of Bushahr and Kullu. The weaving style and materials used for these caps differ from each other. The typical green colored Kinnauri/Bushahri cap is also worn in the adjoining areas of Garhwal Himalayas, specially in Dehradun (Jaunsar-Bawar), Uttarkashi and Tehri Garhwal. A similar, but different variety of red colored cap is worn in Uttarkashi and the neighboring areas of Garhwal (not to be confused with red colored Dhumal cap). These caps are more prevalent in the upper districts of Himachal and Garhwal. In Garhwal these caps are also known as Sikoli.

Material and Shape 
Himachali caps are one of the popular arts and crafts of Himachal Pradesh. The Himachali cap is usually made of wool, and the shape is typically round or boat shape.

Traditional wear 

Cap is an ingrained part of daily wear over there, and it is common during local festivities, religious functions and marriages. Men in almost all hilly areas wear kurta pajamas and caps, and women wear churidar pajamas or salwar with kameez and dupatta (dhatu). Himachali caps are the representation of cultural identity. People in Himachal consider the cap as a pride, like a turban for Sikhs in Punjab.

Political identity 

The colour of the Himachali caps has been an indicator of political loyalties in the hill state for a long period of time with Congress party leaders like Virbhadra Singh donning caps with green band and the rival BJP leader Prem Kumar Dhumal wearing a cap with maroon band.

Gallery

See also 
 Himachal Pradesh
 Rampur chaddar

References 

Indian headgear
Culture of Himachal Pradesh